DYEZ (98.3 FM), broadcasting as 98.3 Love Radio, is a radio station owned and operated by Manila Broadcasting Company. Its studio, offices and transmitter are located at MBC Palawan Broadcast Resources, 4th Floor Ascendo Suite, Malvar Street, Brgy. Mandaragat, Puerto Princesa.

Roster

DJ
 Benjie Parak
 Sexy Terry
 Papa Jack

Schedule

Monday to Friday

Sunday

References

Radio stations in Puerto Princesa
Radio stations established in 1995
Love Radio Network stations